II is the fourth and final studio album by Belgian/Dutch Eurodance band 2 Unlimited. The record is the only album to feature Romy and Marjon as vocalists and was only released in certain European territories.

Despite not garnering a UK release, it did spawn a hit single: "Wanna Get Up", which reached number 38 in Britain.

Track listing
 "Wanna Get Up"  – 3:14 
 "The Edge of Heaven"  – 4:14 
 "Never Surrender"  – 4:31 
 "Closer 2U"  – 5:14 
 "Back into the Groove"  – 4:00 
 "Someone to Get There"  – 5:25 
 "I Am Ready"  – 3:19 
 "Move On Up"  – 4:37 
 "Let's Celebrate"  – 3:56 
 "Be Free Tonight"  – 3:50

In some European countries, "Wanna Get Up", "The Edge of Heaven" and "Never Surrender" were released as singles.

Credits
Backing Vocals [Background Vocals] – Marjon van Iwaarden (tracks: 1 to 5, 9), Romy van Ooyen (tracks: 1 to 5, 9) 
Guitar – Eric Melaerts (tracks: 5, 8, 9) 
Instruments [All], Programmed By, Arranged By – Phil Wilde 
Layout – Seven Productions 
Lyrics By – Jean-Paul De Coster (tracks: 1, 2, 4 to 7, 9, 10), Peter Bauwens (tracks: 1, 3 to 6, 9), Phil Wilde (tracks: 1 to 10), Steven Tracey (tracks: 1, 3, 6 to 9), Xavier Clayton (tracks: 2, 5, 10) 
Mastered By – Rene Schardt 
Mixed By [Mix Engineer] – Peter Bulkens 
Photography By – Roger Dyckmans, Soto & Landé 
Producer – Wilde & De Coster 
Producer [Vocal] – Peter Bauwens

References

1998 albums
2 Unlimited albums
Byte Records albums